KNOC (1450 AM, "95.9 Kix Country") is a classic country radio station. Licensed to Natchitoches, Louisiana, United States, the station serves Natchitoches Parish and surrounding areas. The station is currently owned by Elite Radio Group.

On January 7, 2019, KNOC changed their format from urban adult contemporary to classic country, branded as "95.9 Kix Country".

References

External links

Radio stations in Louisiana
Classic country radio stations in the United States
Radio stations established in 1947
Elite Radio Group